Graphene is a semimetal whose conduction and valence bands meet at the Dirac points, which are six locations in momentum space, the vertices of its hexagonal Brillouin zone, divided into two non-equivalent sets of three points. The two sets are labeled K and K'. By contrast, for traditional semiconductors the primary point of interest is generally Γ, where momentum is zero. Four electronic properties separate it from other condensed matter systems.

Electronic spectrum

Electrons propagating through graphene's honeycomb lattice effectively lose their mass, producing quasi-particles that are described by a 2D analogue of the Dirac equation rather than the Schrödinger equation for spin- particles.

Dispersion relation 

When atoms are placed onto the graphene hexagonal lattice, the overlap between the pz(π) orbitals and the s or the px and py orbitals is zero by symmetry. The pz electrons forming the π bands in graphene can be treated independently. Within this π-band approximation, using a conventional tight-binding model, the dispersion relation (restricted to first-nearest-neighbor interactions only) that produces energy of the electrons with wave vector  is

with the nearest-neighbor (π orbitals) hopping energy γ0 ≈  and the lattice constant . The conduction and valence bands, respectively, correspond to the different signs. With one pz electron per atom in this model the valence band is fully occupied, while the conduction band is vacant. The two bands touch at the zone corners (the K point in the Brillouin zone), where there is a zero density of states but no band gap. The graphene sheet thus displays a semimetallic (or zero-gap semiconductor) character. Two of the six Dirac points are independent, while the rest are equivalent by symmetry. In the vicinity of the K-points the energy depends linearly on the wave vector, similar to a relativistic particle. Since an elementary cell of the lattice has a basis of two atoms, the wave function has an effective 2-spinor structure.

As a consequence, at low energies, even neglecting the true spin, the electrons can be described by an equation that is formally equivalent to the massless Dirac equation. Hence, the electrons and holes are called Dirac fermions. This pseudo-relativistic description is restricted to the chiral limit, i.e., to vanishing rest mass M0, which leads to additional features:

 

Here vF ~  (.003 c) is the Fermi velocity in graphene, which replaces the velocity of light in the Dirac theory;  is the vector of the Pauli matrices;  is the two-component wave function of the electrons and E is their energy.

The equation describing the electrons' linear dispersion relation is

where the wavevector  is measured from the Dirac points (the zero of energy is chosen here to coincide with the Dirac points). The equation uses a pseudospin matrix formula that describes two sublattices of the honeycomb lattice.

'Massive' electrons 
Graphene's unit cell has two identical carbon atoms and two zero-energy states: one in which the electron resides on atom A, the other in which the electron resides on atom B. However, if the two atoms in the unit cell are not identical, the situation changes. Hunt et al. showed that placing hexagonal boron nitride (h-BN) in contact with graphene can alter the potential felt at atom A versus atom B enough that the electrons develop a mass and accompanying band gap of about 30 meV [0.03 Electron Volt (eV)].

The mass can be positive or negative. An arrangement that slightly raises the energy of an electron on atom A relative to atom B gives it a positive mass, while an arrangement that raises the energy of atom B produces a negative electron mass. The two versions behave alike and are indistinguishable via optical spectroscopy. An electron traveling from a positive-mass region to a negative-mass region must cross an intermediate region where its mass once again becomes zero. This region is gapless and therefore metallic. Metallic modes bounding semiconducting regions of opposite-sign mass is a hallmark of a topological phase and display much the same physics as topological insulators.

If the mass in graphene can be controlled, electrons can be confined to massless regions by surrounding them with massive regions, allowing the patterning of quantum dots, wires and other mesoscopic structures. It also produces one-dimensional conductors along the boundary. These wires would be protected against backscattering and could carry currents without dissipation.

Single-atom wave propagation

Electron waves in graphene propagate within a single-atom layer, making them sensitive to the proximity of other materials such as high-κ dielectrics, superconductors and ferromagnetics.

Electron transport

Hole and electron mobilities were expected to be nearly identical.

The corresponding resistivity of graphene sheets would be . This is less than the resistivity of silver, the lowest otherwise known at room temperature. However, on  substrates, scattering of electrons by optical phonons of the substrate is a larger effect than scattering by graphene’s own phonons.

Charge transport is affected by adsorption of contaminants such as water and oxygen molecules. This leads to non-repetitive and large hysteresis I-V characteristics. Researchers must carry out electrical measurements in vacuum. Graphene surfaces can be protected by a coating with materials such as SiN, PMMA and h-BN. In January 2015, the first stable graphene device operation in air over several weeks was reported, for graphene whose surface was protected by aluminum oxide. In 2015 lithium-coated graphene was observed to exhibit superconductivity and in 2017 evidence for unconventional superconductivity was demonstrated in single layer graphene placed on the electron-doped (non-chiral) d-wave superconductor Pr2−xCexCuO4 (PCCO).

Electrical resistance in 40-nanometer-wide nanoribbons of epitaxial graphene changes in discrete steps. The ribbons' conductance exceeds predictions by a factor of 10. The ribbons can act more like optical waveguides or quantum dots, allowing electrons to flow smoothly along the ribbon edges. In copper, resistance increases in proportion to length as electrons encounter impurities.

Transport is dominated by two modes. One is ballistic and temperature independent, while the other is thermally activated. Ballistic electrons resemble those in cylindrical carbon nanotubes. At room temperature, resistance increases abruptly at a particular length—the ballistic mode at 16 micrometres and the other at 160 nanometres.

Graphene electrons can cover micrometer distances without scattering, even at room temperature.

The origin of this minimum conductivity is unclear. However, rippling of the graphene sheet or ionized impurities in the  substrate may lead to local puddles of carriers that allow conduction. Several theories suggest that the minimum conductivity should be ; however, most measurements are of order  or greater and depend on impurity concentration.

Near zero carrier density graphene exhibits positive photoconductivity and negative photoconductivity at high carrier density. This is governed by the interplay between photoinduced changes of both the Drude weight and the carrier scattering rate.

Graphene doped with various gaseous species (both acceptors and donors) can be returned to an undoped state by gentle heating in vacuum. Even for dopant concentrations in excess of 1012 cm−2 carrier mobility exhibits no observable change. Graphene doped with potassium in ultra-high vacuum at low temperature can reduce mobility 20-fold. The mobility reduction is reversible on removing the potassium.

Due to graphene's two dimensions, charge fractionalization (where the apparent charge of individual pseudoparticles in low-dimensional systems is less than a single quantum) is thought to occur. It may therefore be a suitable material for constructing quantum computers using anyonic circuits.

In 2018, superconductivity was reported in twisted bilayer graphene.

Excitonic properties 
First-principle calculations with quasiparticle corrections and many-body effects explore the electronic and optical properties of graphene-based materials. The approach is described as three stages. With GW calculation, the properties of graphene-based materials are accurately investigated, including bulk graphene, nanoribbons, edge and surface functionalized armchair oribbons, hydrogen saturated armchair ribbons, Josephson effect in graphene SNS junctions with single localized defect and armchair ribbon scaling properties.

Magnetic properties 
In 2014 researchers magnetized graphene by placing it on an atomically smooth layer of magnetic yttrium iron garnet. The graphene's electronic properties were unaffected. Prior approaches involved doping. The dopant's presence negatively affected its electronic properties.

Strong magnetic fields

These observations with  indicate that the four-fold degeneracy (two valley and two spin degrees of freedom) of the Landau energy levels is partially or completely lifted. One hypothesis is that the magnetic catalysis of symmetry breaking is responsible for lifting the degeneracy.

Spin transport

Graphene is claimed to be an ideal material for spintronics due to its small spin-orbit interaction and the near absence of nuclear magnetic moments in carbon (as well as a weak hyperfine interaction). Electrical spin current injection and detection has been demonstrated up to room temperature. Spin coherence length above 1 micrometre at room temperature was observed, and control of the spin current polarity with an electrical gate was observed at low temperature.

Spintronic and magnetic properties can be present in graphene simultaneously. Low-defect graphene nanomeshes manufactured using a non-lithographic method exhibit large-amplitude ferromagnetism even at room temperature. Additionally a spin pumping effect is found for fields applied in parallel with the planes of few-layer ferromagnetic nanomeshes, while a magnetoresistance hysteresis loop is observed under perpendicular fields.

Dirac fluid 
Charged particles in high-purity graphene behave as a strongly interacting, quasi-relativistic plasma. The particles move in a fluid-like manner, traveling along a single path and interacting with high frequency. The behavior was observed in a graphene sheet faced on both sides with a h-BN crystal sheet.

Anomalous quantum Hall effect

The quantum Hall effect is a quantum mechanical version of the Hall effect, which is the production of transverse (perpendicular to the main current) conductivity in the presence of a magnetic field.

Graphene shows the quantum Hall effect with respect to conductivity quantization: the effect is anomalous in that the sequence of steps is shifted by 1/2 with respect to the standard sequence and with an additional factor of 4.

This behavior is a direct result of graphene's massless Dirac electrons. In a magnetic field, their spectrum has a Landau level with energy precisely at the Dirac point. This level is a consequence of the Atiyah–Singer index theorem and is half-filled in neutral graphene, leading to the "+1/2" in the Hall conductivity. Bilayer graphene also shows the quantum Hall effect, but with only one of the two anomalies (i.e. ). In the second anomaly, the first plateau at N=0 is absent, indicating that bilayer graphene stays metallic at the neutrality point.

Unlike normal metals, graphene's longitudinal resistance shows maxima rather than minima for integral values of the Landau filling factor in measurements of the Shubnikov–de Haas oscillations, whereby the term integral quantum Hall effect. These oscillations show a phase shift of π, known as Berry’s phase. Berry’s phase arises due to the zero effective carrier mass near the Dirac points. The temperature dependence of the oscillations reveals that the carriers have a non-zero cyclotron mass, despite their zero effective mass.

Graphene samples prepared on nickel films, and on both the silicon face and carbon face of silicon carbide, show the anomalous effect directly in electrical measurements. Graphitic layers on the carbon face of silicon carbide show a clear Dirac spectrum in angle-resolved photoemission experiments. The effect is observed in cyclotron resonance and tunneling experiments.

Casimir effect

The Casimir effect is an interaction between disjoint neutral bodies provoked by the fluctuations of the electrodynamical vacuum. Mathematically it can be explained by considering the normal modes of electromagnetic fields, which explicitly depend on the boundary (or matching) conditions on the interacting bodies' surfaces. Since graphene/electromagnetic field interaction is strong for a one-atom-thick material, the Casimir effect is of interest.

Van der Waals force

The Van der Waals force (or dispersion force) is also unusual, obeying an inverse cubic, asymptotic power law in contrast to the usual inverse quartic.

Effect of substrate
The electronic properties of graphene are significantly influenced by the supporting substrate. The Si(100)/H surface does not perturb graphene's electronic properties, whereas the interaction between it and the clean Si(100) surface changes its electronic states significantly. This effect results from the covalent bonding between C and surface Si atoms, modifying the π-orbital network of the graphene layer. The local density of states shows that the bonded C and Si surface states are highly disturbed near the Fermi energy.

Comparison with nanoribbon

If the in-plane direction is confined, in which case it is referred to as a nanoribbon, its electronic structure is different. If it is "zig-zag" (diagram), the bandgap is zero. If it is "armchair" (diagram), the bandgap is non-zero (see figure).

References

Works cited

External links
 Wolfram demonstration for graphene BZ and electronic dispersion

Graphene
Electrical phenomena